Albin Sandqvist also known by the mononym Albin is a solo Swedish singer. He was part of the Swedish band Star Pilots, a solo electronic / dance pop act.

Albin has also pursued a solo career and in 2005 had a solo hit single "I'll Be Waiting". The maxi single included backing vocals by Marcus Öhrn and Sussie Ottebring with Lee Farmer on guitar. The maxi single also had a remix of the track by Punkstar.

Discography

Singles

References

Swedish male singers
Year of birth missing (living people)
Living people